Sulah is a village in Palampur tehsil in Kangra district of Himachal Pradesh State, India. Sullah is famous for its natural sweet drinking water which locals claim to have medicinal properties.

References

Villages in Kangra district